Golam Ambia (born 2 February 1966) is a former Bangladeshi sprinter who competed in the men's 100m competition at the 1992 Summer Olympics. He recorded an 11.06, not enough to qualify for the next round past the heats. His personal best is 10.40, set in 1991. He was also on Bangladesh's 4 × 100 m team, which posted a 42.18, for 5th in its heat.

References

External links
 

1966 births
Living people
Bangladeshi male sprinters
Athletes (track and field) at the 1992 Summer Olympics
Olympic athletes of Bangladesh
Recipients of the Bangladesh National Sports Award